Boopis is a genus of flowering plants in the family Calyceraceae, native to Chile, Argentina and Brazil. The taxon is believed to be highly polyphyletic.

Species
Currently accepted species include:

Boopis andicola Gand.
Boopis anthemoides Juss.
Boopis australis Decne.
Boopis breviscapa Phil.
Boopis bupleuroides C.A.Müll.
Boopis castillonii (Hicken) Pontiroli
Boopis chubutensis Speg.
Boopis filifolia Speg.
Boopis gracilis Phil.
Boopis graminea Phil.
Boopis itatiaiae Dusén
Boopis juergensii Pilg.
Boopis multicaulis Phil.
Boopis necronensis Zav.-Gallo, S.Denham & Pozner
Boopis patagonica Speg.
Boopis pterocalyx Zav.-Gallo, S.Denham & Pozner
Boopis pusilla Phil.
Boopis raffaellii Speg.

References

Calyceraceae
Asterales genera